The Australian TV series Dancing with the Stars premiered on Tuesday 5 October 2004 and concluded on Tuesday 23 November 2004.
Home and Away star Bec Hewitt (née Cartwright) and partner Michael Mizner won the series, with politician Pauline Hanson and her partner Salvatore Vecchio as runner-up.

Couples

The Australian TV series  [[Dancing with the Stars (Australian TV series)|Dancing with the Stars]] premiered on Tuesday 5 October 2004 and concluded on Tuesday 23 November 2004. It featured the following celebrities.

Scoring chart
Red numbers indicate the couples with the lowest score for each week.
Green numbers indicate the couples with the highest score for each week.
 indicates the couple (or couples) eliminated that week.
 indicates the returning couple that finished in the bottom two.
 indicates the couple withdrew from the competition.
 indicates the winning couple.
 indicates the runner-up couple.
 indicates the third-place couple.

Average chart

The average chart is based on the dances performed by the celebrities and not their place in the competition.

 Week 1 Individual judges scores in the chart below (given in parentheses) are listed in this order from left to right: Todd, Helen, Paul, Mark.''

Running order

Dance schedule
The celebrities and professional partners will dance one of these routines for each corresponding week.

Week 1 : Cha-cha-cha or Waltz
Week 2 : Quickstep or Rumba
Week 3 : Tango or Jive
Week 4 : Paso doble or Foxtrot
Week 5 : Samba
Week 6 : One unlearned Ballroom and Latin dances from weeks 1-5
Week 7 : Final unlearned Ballroom and Latin dances from weeks 1-6 & Freestyle

Dance chart

References

Season 01
2004 Australian television seasons

pl:Dancing with the Stars (Australia)